The Lone Star was a steamer that was wrecked  north of Red Fish Bar near Galveston, Texas, on September 16, 1865.

References

Maritime incidents in September 1865
Shipwrecks in the Gulf of Mexico
Shipwrecks of the Texas coast
Steamships